Jürgen Klaus Hennig (born in Stuttgart, Germany on March 5, 1951) is a German chemist and medical physicist. Internationally he is considered to be one of the pioneers of Magnetic Resonance Imaging for clinical diagnostics. He is the Scientific Director of the Department of Diagnostic Radiology and Chairman of the Magnetic Resonance Development and Application Center (MRDAC) at the University Medical Center Freiburg.  In the year 2003 he was awarded the Max Planck Research Award in the category of Biosciences and Medicine.

Biography

Scientific career 
From 1969 to 1977 Hennig studied chemistry in Stuttgart, London, Munich and Freiburg. During the years from 1977 to 1981 he was employed as a scientist at the Institute for Physical Chemistry (IPC) of the University of Freiburg, where he completed his doctoral degree on NMR measurements of intramolecular exchange kinetics under the supervision of Herbert Zimmermann. During this time Hennig first came into contact with Magnetic Resonance Imaging (MRI) at the inaugural lecture of his advisor Hans-Heinrich Limbach on the work of Paul Lauterbur, a subsequent winner of the Nobel Prize.

From 1982 to 1983 Hennig was a post-doctoral student at the University of Zurich, where he worked in the area of CIDNP Spectroscopy. In 1982 he developed his first own NMR pulse sequence to measure intramolecular exchange processes. During his time in Zurich Hennig decided to focus his future work in the area of NMR method development with less focus on chemistry.

Hennig began his work at the University Medical Center Freiburg in 1984 as a scientific researcher in the Department of Diagnostic Radiology. There, in cooperation with the company Bruker Medizintechnik GmbH, he developed the RARE-Method. In the year 1989 he completed his professorial thesis of “Special Imaging Techniques for the Nuclear Magnetic Resonance Tomography” at the Medical Faculty of the University of Freiburg.

In the year 1993, Hennig was appointed a professorship at the University Medical Center Freiburg as the head of the MR Tomography work group in the Department of Diagnostic Radiology. In 1998 he was designated as the Director of the Department of Imaging and Functional Medical Physics of the Department of Diagnostic Radiology. In 2001 he became Research Director of the Department of Diagnostic Radiology. In the same year he founded the Magnetic Resonance Development and Application Center (MRDAC) at the University Medical Center Freiburg. A cooptation at the School of Mathematics and Physics of the University of Freiburg followed in the year 2002.

In 2004 Hennig was appointed C4-Professor at the University Medical Center Freiburg and since then he is the Scientific Director of the Department of Diagnostic Radiology. The research group for research and development in MRI that he founded and headed since 1984 grew to approximately 80 employees by the end of 2012.

In 1999 Hennig was the President of the International Society for Magnetic Resonance in Medicine (ISMRM). 
Since 2008 he has been a joint affiliate to the Wisconsin Institute for Medical Research at the University of Wisconsin–Madison.
Since 2011 he has been a member of the German Academy of Sciences Leopoldina.

Works 
Hennig has written numerous fundamental research papers on the development of Magnetic Resonance Imaging (MRI).

Based on the CPMG multi-echo method, Hennig developed the RARE Sequence (Rapid Acquisition with Relaxation Enhancement) in 1984. Through his work the MR image acquisition time could be significantly reduced, which constituted an important step for its use in clinical routine. In addition, RARE offered the possibility to control the diagnostically relevant T2 contrast in MRI. The RARE method was first published in 1984 in the German journal “Der Radiologe”. His first submission to an international journal was rejected, with the comment that this method had already been tested and wouldn’t work. In the year 1986 international publications followed. RARE is currently one of the standard methods used in clinical MRI. The method is also known by the acronyms TSE (Turbo Spin Echo) and FSE (Fast Spin Echo).

The Hyperecho method was published by Hennig in 2001. With hyperechoes the Specific absorption rate (SAR) of a RARE sequence can be significantly reduced while the image quality is almost completely maintained. This is important for clinical MRI applications at high magnetic field strengths.

In 2008 Hennig published a concept for imaging with non-linear magnetic field gradients which allows increasing the image resolution in brain MRI in the outer image regions.

He and his team also organize educative workshops under support of ESMRMB.

Connections to Asia 
In the year 1985 Hennig travelled to Guangzhou, China in order to set up one of the first MRI systems in China. With this the first MR image was taken in China on December 25, 1985.  Since then he has attended other MRI system installations in China.

Hennig has been president and founding member of the European-Chinese Society for Clinical Magnetic Resonance since 1993. He is honorary member of the Chinese Radiological Society. Hennig was awarded “Einstein Professor” of the Chinese Academy of Science in 2011. In 2010 he received the Tsung Ming Tu Award, which is the highest scientific award of Taiwan.

Since 2004 Hennig is a member of the Academy of Science of the Republic of Tatarstan. Furthermore, he maintains cooperations with Hong Kong, South Korea and Singapore.

Awards 
 1992: European Magnetic Resonance Award 
 1993: 'Kernspintomographie-Preis' (Magnetic Resonance Tomography Award) 1993
 1994: Gold Medal Award of the Society of Magnetic Resonance 
 2003: Max Planck Research Award in der category Biosciences/Medicine 
 2006: Albers Schönberg Medal from the 'Deutschen Röntgengesellschaft' (German Radiology Society)
 2010: Tsung Ming Tu Award from the National Science Council, Taiwan
 2014: Honorary Doctorate from the University Maastricht
 2015: Hounsfield Memorial Lecture Imperial College London
 2016: Alfred-Breit-Preis from Deutschen Röntgengesellschaft (German radiological Society)

Quotes

References

External links 
 Website of the Medical Physics group at the University Medical Center Freiburg
 Website of the Magnetic Resonance Development and Applications Centers, MRDAC
 Website of the International Society for Magnetic Resonance in Medicine, ISMRM
 Website of the European Chinese Society for Clinical Magnetic Resonance, ECSCMR
 Publication list of ResearcherID F-2424-2010 Jürgen Hennig
 Research database University of Freiburg, publication list Jürgen Hennig
 

1951 births
Academic staff of the University of Freiburg
German biophysicists
20th-century German inventors
20th-century German chemists
Living people
Scientists from Stuttgart
21st-century German inventors